Casas del Tratado de Tordesillas (Houses of Treaty of Tordesillas in English) are two united palaces located in Tordesillas, Spain. The negotiations that gave rise to the Treaty of Tordesillas took place there, through which Spain and Portugal shared the New World, giving rise to Ibero-America.

History

On October 12, 1492, Columbus arrived in the New World. To defend Castilian sovereignty over the territories newly found by Columbus, Isabella and Ferdinand sought help from Pope Alexander VI (Rodrigo Borgia), who had been elected in August 1492 and with whom they had a long list of mutual favors. The Pope issued four bulls, known as Alexandrian Bulls. In them he established that the lands and seas to the west of the meridian located 100 leagues west of the Azores and Cape Verde belonged to the crown of Castile. Excommunication was decreed for all those who crossed that meridian without authorization from the kings of Castile.

The prerogatives derived from the Alexandrian Bulls, especially from the last Inter Caetera, very favorable to the Castilians, did not satisfy Juan II of Portugal, who was excluded from the Americas, since the line of demarcation traced by papal design relegated him to the African coasts, leaving the New World for the king and queen of Castile and Aragon. The Catholic Monarchs and the Lusitanian monarch then negotiated a bilateral treaty.

Diplomatic delegations met for several months in Tordesillas, in the current province of Valladolid. According to the Portuguese chronicler García de Resende, the Portuguese ambassadors received secret reports from Lisbon on what would be the negotiating position of the Castilians with direct instructions from King Juan.

Finally, the delegates of both monarchies reached an agreement that was reflected in a treaty, signed on June 7, 1494, today called the Treaty of Tordesillas.

Buildings

The oldest palace dates from the end of the 15th century. Its façade conserves the coat of arms of the Catholic Monarchs. The other palace was built in the middle of the 17th century and was the residence of a wealthy family. Both were subjected to a major restoration in 1994, on the occasion of the 500th anniversary of the Treaty. Two years later they were declared assets of cultural interest. They are used for cultural and tourist reasons related to the treaty and the time of the Catholic Monarchs.

See also
Treaty of Tordesillas

References

Works cited

Further reading

External links

 Treaty of Tordesillas (about.com)
 Treaty of Tordesillas museum

Palaces in Valladolid